Mónica Miguel (born Gloria Chávez Miguel; 13 March 1936 – 12 August 2020) was a Mexican actress, director, and singer.

Career
Passionate about the arts and especially the theater, she would attend the occasional stage plays that came to Tepic. She joined a performance troupe that was supported by the local administration, but that support came to an end when the administration changed hands.

In pursuit of her artistic dreams on the stage, she traveled to Mexico City. She studied theater at the academy of the Asociación Nacional de Actores. Encouraged by colleagues, she traveled to Japan and then Italy, where she worked in film, theater, and television. There she recorded her first album. Her eight-year stay in Rome gave her maturity as a human being and as an artist. She gave recitals in Greece, Cyprus, and England.

After her return to Mexico, for her performances at the Insurgentes theater, in the works Vine, ví y mejor me fuí and La maestra bebe un poco, she received an award from the Unión de cronistas de Teatro (Union of Theater Critics). In 1981 she performed in "The Merry Wives of Windsor" together with Alfredo Sevilla, Tara Parra Chela Nájera among others. In 1981, the Mexican Association of Theater Critics named her best actress and singer for her performance in Man of La Mancha.

In 1986, she received the María Tereza Montoya and Virginia Fábregas prizes for her acting in Aire frío.

Since 1988, she has directed many popular, internationally distributed soap operas. This work has earned her prizes from the Herald and New York Latin ACE Award. A promoter of the arts of her homeland, she promoted and supported the artistic and cultural values of her fellow countrymen, and was a member of ANDA (National Actors Association of Mexico).

Death
Monica Miguel's death was announced by the Mexican Asociación Nacional de Intérpretes on August 12, 2020. The Organización Nayarita para Desarrollar el Arte (ONDA Nayarit) tweeted, “Con profunda pena notificamos el fallecimiento de la actriz, interprete y directora de escena Mónica Miguel. Descanse en paz. Nuestras más sentidas condolencias y solidaridad para su familia.” ("It is with deep sadness that we notify the death of the actress, interpreter and stage director Mónica Miguel. Rest in peace. Our deepest condolences and solidarity for her family.")

Filmography

As Actress
 Radionovelas
 Rayo de plata (Doce Balas contra el Mal)
 Kalimán - Profanadores de Tumbas ... Nila Tagore
 Kalimán - Las Momias de Machu-Pichu ... Pekembá
 Kalimán - La Reina de los Gorilas ... Sandra
 Kalimán - Los Samurais Mensajeros de la Muerte ... Diana Morris
 Kalimán - Más Allá del Más Allá ... The Queen of night

 Film
 El tigre de Guanajuato (1965)
 El planeta de las mujeres invasoras (1967) - Fitia
 La notte dei serpenti (1969) - Ignacio's wife
 Una pistola per cento croci! (1971) - Jenny
 Bring Me the Head of Alfredo Garcia (1974) - Dolores de Escomiglia
 Víbora caliente (1976) - Ramona
 Oficio de tinieblas (1981) - Catalina Díaz Puíljo
 Under Fire (1983) - Doctora
 Gertrudis Bocanegra (1992) - Nana
 Más allá del muro (2009)
 Sueño en otro idioma (2017) - Jacinta

 Telenovelas and series

 Entre brumas (1973)
 La casa de Bernarda Alba (1974, TV Movie) - Magdalena
 Orfeo 9 (1975, TV Movie) - Chiromante
 Winnetou el mescalero (1980, TV Movie) - Nalin Vincent
 Por amor (1982) - Ramona
 Amalia Batista (1983) - Matilde
 Abandonada (1985) - Lucía
 El engaño (1986) - Carmen
 Cómo duele callar (1987) - Casimira
 Yesenia (1987) - Trifenia
 Flor y canela (1988) - Ana
 Morir para vivir (1989)
 Cuando llega el amor (1990) - Yulma
 Amor de nadie (1990) - Socorro
 De frente al sol (1992) - Amaranta
 Más allá del puente (1993) - Amaranta
 Lazos de amor (1995) - Chole
 María Isabel (1997) - Chona
 Mujer, casos de la vida real (1999-2006)
 La casa en la playa (2000) - María Estrada
 Alborada (2005-2006) - Modesta
 Sexo y otros secretos (2008) - Mónica
 Sortilegio (2009) - Maya San Juan
 La fuerza del destino (2011) - Sanadora Seri
 La Tempestad (2013) - Madre Eusebia
 M.D.: Life on the Line (2019) - Doña Inés (fina appearance)

As Director 

 Director of dialog for Quinceñera (1987)
 Second part of Amor en silencio (1988)
 Flor y canela (1988-1989)
 Cuando llega el amor (1990)
 Amor de nadie (1990-1991)
 De frente al sol (1992)
 First part of Entre la vida y la muerte (1993)
 Los parientes pobres (1993)
 Más allá del puente (1993-1994)
 Alondra (1995)
 Lazos de amor (1995-1996)
 Te sigo amando (1996-1997)
 María Isabel (1997-1998)
 El privilegio de amar (1998-1999)
 La casa en la playa (2000)
 Mi destino eres tú (2000)
 El Manantial (2001-2002)
 Amor real (2003)
 Alborada (2005-2006)
 Pasión (2007-2008)
 Sortilegio (2009)
 Teresa (2010-2011)
 La Tempestad (2013)
 Lo imperdonable (2015)
 Silvia, frente a ti (2019)

References

External links
 
 

Mexican stage actresses
Mexican telenovela actresses
Mexican telenovela directors
People from Tepic
1936 births
2020 deaths
Actresses from Nayarit
Women television directors